KLEF (98.1 FM) is a commercial classical music radio station in Anchorage, Alaska, United States. It is owned by Chinook Concert Broadcasters and operates from studios located on 65th Avenue. It is one of the last commercial classical music stations operating in the United States.

History

Northern Way Broadcasting, Inc., was granted a construction permit to build a new radio station on 98.1 MHz in Anchorage on December 15, 1986, after settling with two other applicants for the frequency. However, before construction, Northern Way sold the permit in 1987 to Chinook Concert Broadcasters. Chinook Concert was owned by Rick Goodfellow along with seven California families and one in Sitka, Alaska, and the station was consulted by Ed Davis, one of the founders and owners of KDFC in San Francisco. Davis, intrigued by the idea of a classical music station in Alaska, contributed technical expertise and also recruited most of the investors. KLEF began broadcasting on September 16, 1988, with Beethoven's Symphony No. 9 and Variations on the Alaska Flag Song by local composer Paul Rosenthal as the first selections played.

The launch of a new commercial classical music station was unusual in an era when such stations in other major markets were falling by the wayside. The KLEF call letters were illustrative of this. They had last been used at two such stations, one of which had been sold and changed formats: 94.5 FM in Houston, which had been KLEF from 1964 to 1986 before being sold, and 92.1 FM in nearby Seabrook, Texas, which used the designation when it picked up the format only to decide on new call letters upon a sale a year later. The station was also a success with listeners, denting the ratings of public radio station KSKA. By 1994, KLEF was tied for eighth in total audience in a 20-station market, but it was second in the affluent 35–64 demographic.

In 1998, Chinook Concert Broadcasters acquired KASH (1080 AM), an AM station spun off as a result of commercial station consolidation. It primarily broadcast business talk shows and BBC World Service output. The money-losing AM station, which changed to a progressive talk format under the call sign KUDO, was sold in 2005 to a local of the International Brotherhood of Electrical Workers. In 2008, Goodfellow attributed KLEF's consistent success to the unavailability of satellite radio – which serves many classical music listeners in the Lower 48 but cannot be received in Alaska – and the lack of an easy listening-format station. On KLEF's 25th anniversary in 2013, Goodfellow calculated that there were 55 commercial classical stations in the United States when the station signed on in 1988 but just three a quarter-century later: KLEF, WFMT in Chicago, and WRR in Dallas.

References

External links

1988 establishments in Alaska
Classical music radio stations in the United States
Radio stations established in 1988
LEF